The 1916 Tewkesbury by-election was held on 16 May 1916.  The by-election was held due to the death of the incumbent Conservative MP, Michael Hicks Beach, Viscount Quenington, in the First World War.  It was won by the Conservative candidate William Frederick Hicks-Beach, Quenington's uncle, then aged 74.

References

1916 in England
1916 elections in the United Kingdom
By-elections to the Parliament of the United Kingdom in Gloucestershire constituencies
20th century in Gloucestershire